Gertrude of Flanders may refer to:
 Gertrude of Flanders, Duchess of Lorraine (d. 1115/26), daughter of Robert I, Count of Flanders
 Gertrude of Flanders, Countess of Savoy (1112–1186), daughter of Thierry, Count of Flanders
 Gertrude of Flanders (Blackadder), fictional character in the popular BBC sitcom Blackadder